The white-throated antbird (Oneillornis salvini) is a species of bird in the family Thamnophilidae. It is found in Bolivia, Brazil and Peru. Its natural habitat is subtropical or tropical moist lowland forests.

This species is a specialist ant-followers that relies on swarms of army ants to flush insects and other arthropods out of the leaf litter.

The  white-throated antbird was described by the German ornithologist Hans von Berlepsch in 1901 and given the binomial name Pithys salvini. It was subsequently included in the genus Gymnopithys until moved to the newly erected genus Oneillornis based on the results of a molecular phylogenetic study published in 2014.

References

Further reading

white-throated antbird
Birds of the Peruvian Amazon
Birds of the Bolivian Amazon
white-throated antbird
Taxonomy articles created by Polbot